Bernard R. LeBlanc (born 1949) is a politician in the province of New Brunswick, Canada. He was elected to the Legislative Assembly of New Brunswick in the 2006 election as the Liberal MLA for the new district of Memramcook-Lakeville-Dieppe.

He was appointed to cabinet on November 12, 2008.

On February 11, 2010, LeBlanc resigned from cabinet, amid allegations that an email he sent violated the privacy rights of a Fredericton-area woman by revealing private information about her.

References 

Living people
Members of the Executive Council of New Brunswick
New Brunswick Liberal Association MLAs
Acadian people
1949 births
21st-century Canadian politicians